The de Raedt Baronetcy, of The Hague, was a title in the Baronetage of England.  It was created on 30 May 1660 for Gualter de Raedt. Nothing further is known of him or the title.

de Raedt baronets, of The Hague (1660)
Sir Gualter de Raedt, 1st Baronet

References

Extinct baronetcies in the Baronetage of England